Smith is a male given name. Notable people with the name include:

 Smith D. Atkins
 Smith Ballew
 Smith Barrier
 Smith W. Brookhart
 Smith Dharmasaroja
 Smith Dun
 Smith Ely Jr.
 Smith Hart
 Smith H. Hastings
 Smith Hempstone
 Smith Hickenlooper
 Smith Ely Jelliffe
 Smith Joseph
 Smith E. Lane
 Smith Larimer
 Smith McPherson
 Smith Nickerson
 Smith Newell Penfield
 Smith Thompson
 Smith Mead Weed
 Smith Wigglesworth
 Smith D. Woods